Thomas Holm Jakobsen is a Danish sprint canoer who competed in the late 1990s. He won a silver medal in the K-2 1000 m event at the 1997 ICF Canoe Sprint World Championships in Dartmouth, Nova Scotia.

References

Danish male canoeists
Living people
Year of birth missing (living people)
ICF Canoe Sprint World Championships medalists in kayak